Atelopus palmatus (common name: Andersson's stubfoot toad) is a species of toad in the family Bufonidae. Its type locality is "Rio Pastaza".

Description
Males measure  and females  in snout–vent length.

Habitat and conservation
Its natural habitats are humid montane forests. It is a diurnal species. Males have been observed during the night on dry leaves by a marsh, and during the day between rocks and sand by water. A female has been observed during the day in flooded leaf litter on a swamp. Gravid females carrying about 80 eggs have been found between March and July.

It is most threatened by the fungal infectious disease chytridiomycosis which causes dramatic decline and affects other species of its genus. Other threats include habitat loss through agriculture (both crops and livestock), logging, planned mining and wood plantations.

References

palmatus
Amphibians of Ecuador
Endemic fauna of Ecuador
Amphibians described in 1945
Taxonomy articles created by Polbot
Taxa named by Lars Gabriel Andersson